Milan Vobořil (born July 6, 1977) is a Czech professional ice hockey defenceman. He is currently playing with HC Slovan Ustecti Lvi of the Czech First League.

Voboril has played 182 games in the Czech Extraliga with HC Plzeň and HC Litvínov.

References 
 
 

1977 births
Living people
Czech ice hockey defencemen
HC Slovan Ústečtí Lvi players
HC Plzeň players
HC Stadion Litoměřice players
HC Most players
Sportovní Klub Kadaň players